|}

The Prix du Muguet is a Group 2 flat horse race in France open to thoroughbreds aged four years or older. It is run over a distance of 1,600 metres (about 1 mile) at Saint-Cloud in early May.

History
The event is traditionally held at Saint-Cloud on 1 May, the French public holiday of Fête du Travail and Fête du Muguet. It is named after Muguet, the French word for the spring-flowering plant Lily of the Valley.

The Prix du Muguet was formerly a 2,000-metre race restricted to three-year-olds. The present version, a 1,600-metre race for older horses, was introduced in 1967. It was contested over 2,000 metres at Longchamp in 1968.

The race was not run in 1971, and it resumed with Group 3 status in 1972. It was absent again in 1974, and for a period thereafter it was sometimes staged at Longchamp (1976–77, 1982–83 and 1985).

The Prix du Muguet was promoted to Group 2 level in 1995.

Records
Most successful horse (2 wins):
 Martillo – 2004, 2005

Leading jockey (4 wins):
 Freddy Head – Ellora (1976), Northjet (1981), Pink (1985), Exit to Nowhere (1992)
 Olivier Peslier – Zabar (1994), Vetheuil (1996), Keltos (2002), Dandoun (2003)

Leading trainer (9 wins):
 André Fabre – Colour Chart (1991), Vetheuil (1996), Dansili (2000), Byword (2010), Vadamos (2016), Jimmy Two Times (2017), Plumatic (2019), Persian King (2020), Duhail (2021)

Leading owner (3 wins):
 Stavros Niarchos – Redmead (1984), Exit to Nowhere (1992), Spinning World (1997)
 Jacques Wertheimer – Pink (1985), Val des Bois (1990), Green Tune (1995)
 Wertheimer et Frère – Gold Away (1999), Bawina (2015), Plumatic (2019)

Winners since 1979

Earlier winners

 1967: Agy
 1968: Frontal
 1969: Prince Jet
 1970: Regent Street
 1971: no race
 1972: Blinis
 1973: Jan Ekels
 1974: no race
 1975: Brinkmanship
 1976: Ellora
 1977: Mittainvilliers
 1978: Faraway Times

See also
 List of French flat horse races

References

 France Galop / Racing Post:
 galop.courses-france.com:
 1967–1979, 1980–present
 france-galop.com – A Brief History: Prix du Muguet.
 galopp-sieger.de – Prix du Muguet.
 ifhaonline.org – International Federation of Horseracing Authorities – Prix du Muguet (2019).
 pedigreequery.com – Prix du Muguet – Saint-Cloud.

Open mile category horse races
Saint-Cloud Racecourse
Horse races in France
1967 establishments in France
Recurring sporting events established in 1967